Lower Klamath Lake is a lake in Siskiyou County, California. At one time it was connected to Upper Klamath Lake. It currently is used to hold overflow water for Klamath Project irrigation uses.

The lake is in Northern California, near the border with Oregon. The Lower Klamath National Wildlife Refuge (est. 1908), which covers the northern part of the lake, extends from California into Oregon.

The area around the lake was in the homeland of the indigenous Modoc people, prior to mid−19th century Anglo−American immigration.

See also
List of lakes in California

References

 The Columbia Gazetteer of North America. New York: Columbia University Press, 2000.

External links
Lower Klamath National Wildlife Refuge

Lakes of Siskiyou County, California
Klamath River
Lakes of California
Lakes of Northern California